Rekhasim (lit. Mountain ridges) is a Haredi town and local council in the Haifa District of Israel. It is located between Kiryat Tiv'on, Kiryat Ata, and Nesher, next to roads 70, 75, and 762.

It is ranked low (2 out of 10) on the Israeli socio-economic scale.

Etymology
The town was named after a verse in the Book of Isaiah (Isaiah 40:4), because it is located on four mountain ranges.

Geography
Rekhasim lies on four hills near Mount Carmel, labelled with Hebrew letters (Hill Alef, Bet, Gimel and Dalet). It borders two villages in the Zvulun Regional Council: the Jewish Kfar Hasidim and Arab Ibtin.

History
Rekhasim was founded in 1951 by released soldiers and residents of nearby ma'abarot. It initially absorbed large numbers of immigrants from India, Morocco, Romania, Russia, and Yemen.

In 1955 the Knesses Chizkiyahu yeshiva relocated here from Zikhron Ya'akov. The yeshiva purchased a  lot on the outskirts of the village and five buildings containing a beth midrash, dining hall, dormitories and offices, moving into its new home at the end of April 1955. A small Haredi community developed around the yeshiva, but the majority of residents remained non-Haredi into the 1990s. In 1995 the secular school closed, many non-religious residents left, and the village developed a Haredi majority, with both Ashkenazi and Sephardi neighborhoods. It is now considered a desirable and growing community for young Haredi families.

Educational offerings include tens of kindergartens, six Talmud Torahs, three girls' schools, three yeshiva ketanas, three yeshiva gedolas, and numerous kolels. In addition to the Knesses Chizkiyahu yeshiva system, there is the Sephardi Yeshivat Rechasim, with 400 students.

Rekhasim has more than 80 synagogues and numerous chesed and gemach organizations.

References

Haifa District
Local councils in Haifa District
1951 establishments in Israel
Populated places established in 1951